Levittown is the name of several large suburban housing developments created in the United States (including one in Puerto Rico) by  William J. Levitt and his company Levitt & Sons. Built after World War II for returning white veterans and their new families, the communities offered attractive alternatives to cramped central city locations and apartments. The Veterans Administration and the Federal Housing Administration (FHA) guaranteed builders that qualified veterans could buy housing for a fraction of rental costs.

The first Levittown home sold for $7,900 and in a short period of time, 17,000 units were sold, providing homes for 84,000 people. In addition to normal family dwellings, Levittowns provided private meeting areas, swimming pools, public parks, and recreational facilities.

Production was modeled on assembly lines in 27 steps with construction workers trained to perform one step. A house could be built in one day, with 36 men, when effectively scheduled. This enabled quick and economical production of similar or identical homes with rapid recovery of costs. Standard Levittown houses included a white picket fence, green lawns, and modern appliances. Sales in the original Levittown began in March 1947. 1,400 homes were purchased during the first three hours.

Places

 Levittown, New York - the first Levittown (built 1947–1951)
 Levittown, Pennsylvania - the second Levittown (1952–1958)
 Willingboro Township, New Jersey - originally and colloquially known as Levittown (started 1958)
 Levittown, Puerto Rico (1963)
 Bowie, Maryland (1964)

Gallery

Controversy 

William J. Levitt refused to sell Levittown homes to people of color, and the FHA, upon authorizing loans for the construction of Levittown, included racial covenants in each deed, making each Levittown a segregated community.
The first black family, the Myers, who bought a second-hand house there in Pennsylvania, in 1957 experienced attacks on their house, and up to 500 whites gathering outside their house. Martin Luther King met with the family, and their plight led to legislative change. They stayed for four years until Myers, a World War II veteran, got a job elsewhere. These events were recorded in the contemporary documentary film "Racism in America Small Town 1950s Case Study Documentary Film" which interviews white residents there but not the Myers.

See also

 Redlining

References

 
History of veterans' affairs in the United States
Mass production
Planned communities in the United States
Planned residential developments

Veterans' settlement schemes